The Age of Em: Work, Love and Life when Robots Rule the Earth is a 2016 nonfiction book by Robin Hanson.

Summary
It explores the implications of a future world in which researchers haven't created artificial general intelligence but have learned to copy humans onto computers, creating “ems,” or emulated people, who quickly come to outnumber the real ones.

The book's main scenario proposes that in about a hundred years from now, human brains will be scanned at "fine enough spatial and chemical resolution," and combined with rough models of signal-processing functions of brain cells, "to create a cell-by-cell dynamically executable model of the full brain in artificial hardware, a model whose signal input-output behavior is usefully close to that of the original brain."

Reception
Seth Baum reviewed the book in Futures. He commended the book for bringing a social science perspective, for the detail it gives, and for providing a starting point for further study. He also questioned the book's perspective that the scenario was a desirable one, criticized some of the book's arguments, and stated that different authors would reach different conclusions about the same topic.

See also
 Mind uploading in fiction
 Mind uploading

References

External links
http://ageofem.com/

2016 non-fiction books
Futurology books
Transhumanist books
Oxford University Press books